Gals may refer to:

 Gals (satellite), Russian communications satellite
 Gals, Switzerland, Seeland, Bern; a municipality
 Gals!, a shoujo Japanese manga comic by  Mihona Fujii
 GALS screen (gait, arms, legs, spine), a medical screening test
 Globally asynchronous locally synchronous, an electronic circuit architecture

See also

 
 Gals, Incorporated (1943 film) U.S. comedy film
 The Girls (1961 film), Soviet film of 1962, alternative translation
 Gal (disambiguation), for the singular of "gals"